Tim Giles is a jazz drummer who won the Daily Telegraph Young Composer of the Year Award in 1992 at the age of 12 and has gone on to perform with a variety of jazz musicians.  Giles was a member of Richard Fairhurst's Hungry Ants, and later formed his own group, Fraud, with James Allsopp.  Fraud won the Jazz on 3 Innovation Award at the 2008 BBC Jazz Awards.

References 

Year of birth missing (living people)
Living people
English jazz drummers
British male drummers
Musicians from Suffolk
British male jazz musicians